John Churin is Chief Technology Officer for Tolven. He is well known in the industry as the original developer and architect for the ALL-IN-1 office-automation product suite in 1977 while working for Digital Equipment Corporation
.

References

Bibliography 

 Tony Redmond. ALL-IN-1: A Technical Odyssey. Digital Press, Elsevier 1991. .
 Tony Redmond. ALL-IN-1: For System Managers and Application Developers. Digital Press, Elsevier 1993. .
 Tony Redmond. ALL-IN-1: Managing and Programming in V3.0. Digital Press, Elsevier 1995. .

Living people
Digital Equipment Corporation people
Chief technology officers
Year of birth missing (living people)